Rubber Duck is an album by country musician C. W. McCall, released on Polydor Records in 1976 (see 1976 in music). It is his fourth album, released the same year as Wilderness, but concentrating on the themes the McCall character was popular for – trucking, as opposed to the various depictions of nature that could be found in Wilderness. Among others, the album contains the song "'Round the World with the Rubber Duck", a sequel to McCall's earlier wildly popular hit "Convoy", with many humorous and absurd elements added. "Audubon" is a quasi-autobiographical song, while "Ratchetjaw" is a take on trucker slang, with a multitude of CB-related terminology included in the lyrics.

As with most works credited to C. W. McCall, all of the songwriting on the album is credited to Bill Fries (a former advertising executive who adopted the C. W. McCall persona) as lyricist and vocalist, and Chip Davis, who wrote the music.

Track listing
 "'Round the World with the Rubber Duck" (Bill Fries, Chip Davis) – 4:08
 "Audubon" (Fries, Davis) – 3:41
 "Super Slab Showdown" (Fries, Davis)
 "Windshield Wipers in the Rain" (Fries, Davis) – 3:41
 "Sing Silent Night" (Fries, Davis)
 "Ratchetjaw" (Fries, Davis) – 2:38
 "Nishnabotna" (Fries, Davis)
 "Two-Way Lovin'" (Fries, Davis)
 "Camp Bird Mine" (Fries, Davis) – 3:36
 "Niobrara" (Fries, Davis)

Personnel

 C. W. McCall – Vocals, Design
 Milt Bailey, Christopher Cable, Mike Hirsch, Ruth Horn, Gary Morris, Mel Olsen, Jan Sheldrick, Jerry Smithers, Dick Solowicz, Sarah Westphalen – Vocals
 Chip Davis – Vocals, Drums, Indian Whittle, Producer, Arranger
 Bill Berg, Don Simmons, Terry Wadell – Drums
 Joan Allen, Jackson Berkey – Keyboards
 Jimmy Johnson, Chuck Sanders – Bass
 Eric Hansen – Bass, Harmonica
 Ron Cooley, Ron Steele – 12-String Guitar, Electric Guitar
 Larry Morton – Electric Guitar
 Stu Basore – Steel Guitar
 Bobbie Thomas – Banjo
 Mortimer Alpert, Irene Berudt, Myrtle Bowman, Dorothy Brown, Hugh Brown, Miriam Dufflemeyer, Jinni Eldred, Lucinda Gladics, James Hammond, Joe Landes, Beth McCollum, Barbara Potter, Merton Shatzkin, Alex Sokol, Phillip Wachowski – Strings

Additional personnel

 Don Sears – Producer, Engineer, Design, Photography
 John Boyd, Ron Ubel – Engineers

Charts

Album – Billboard (North America)

Singles – Billboard (North America)

External links
 NarrowGauge.org album information for Rubber Duck

Rubber Duck
Rubber Duck
Rubber Duck